Amityville Dollhouse is a 1996 American supernatural horror film directed by Steve White and starring Robin Thomas, Allen Cutler, Lenore Kasdorf, and Lisa Robin Kelly. The film follows a family who find themselves haunted after discovering a dollhouse replica of 112 Ocean Avenue—the site of the Amityville hauntings—on their property, which is possessed by a powerful demon. It is the eighth film in the Amityville Horror film series and was released directly to video. This was the last film in the series released before it was rebooted nine years later.

Plot
Newlyweds Bill and Claire Martin move their new family into a new house constructed by Bill himself. Shortly after moving in, Bill finds a dollhouse (modeled after 112 Ocean Avenue) in the shed. He brings it into the house and puts it in the garage. Later that night, Bill notices the fireplace in the house turns on by itself, heating the entire home. He has a hallucination of his daughter Jessica burning to death in the fireplace. The following morning, Claire finds the dollhouse in the garage and suggests giving it to Jessica for her birthday. At her birthday party, Jessica's aunt Marla and uncle Tobias arrive. Jessica is elated over the dollhouse and finds a chest of miniature dolls inside it. Her aunt and uncle, however, seem inexplicably nervous regarding the toys.

In the ensuing days, numerous strange incidents occur: Jimmy, Claire's eldest son, loses his pet mouse, which finds its way into the dollhouse; simultaneously, Jessica is confronted by an enormous white mouse hiding under her bed. Claire also begins to have unexpected sexual urges toward Todd, Bill's eldest son, and fantasizes about him while having sex with Bill. Nightmares plague Bill about voodoo dolls, demons, and his family being murdered. In conversation with Marla, Bill reveals he suffered from similar dreams as a child, including a premonitory dream of his parents dying in a fire, which came true. Jimmy also experiences supernatural visitations from his deceased father, who appears to him as a decaying zombie, urging him to murder Bill.

One afternoon, Todd brings his girlfriend, Dana, to the home. While in an exterior shed on the property, the two find newspaper clippings about the foundation on which Bill built their new home: they surmise that the new house was built around the fireplace from the original home. The two begin to have sex, but a giant fly attacks them and tries to burrow into Todd's ear. The following evening, Bill and Claire go out for dinner, leaving Todd to babysit Jimmy and Jessica. Todd invites Dana over and sends the children to bed. While Todd makes cocktails in the kitchen, Dana's hair inexplicably catches fire, leaving her in a coma with disfiguring burns. Todd blames his father for the accident, believing a faulty coil in the fireplace's gas line caused it.

Meanwhile, Marla and Tobias, who apparently practice magic, have taken one of the dolls from Jessica's dollhouse. They perform a ritual on the doll and watch it come to life. Objects begin to fly around their home, and Tobias stabs the doll with a knife, after which a large fly escapes. Later, Claire finds an unexplained bruise on Jimmy's face and believes Bill hit him. She shuts him out of the house, only to be confronted by the zombie of her deceased husband, tying her and Jimmy up and forcing them to sit by the fireplace. Bill attempts to enter the house through the garage but is knocked unconscious by carbon monoxide fumes from his car, which begins running by itself. Tobias arrives at the home and is able to save Bill. The two enter the home: Tobias has the voodoo doll he had taken from the dollhouse with him.

Tobias and Bill fight with the zombie, and Jimmy throws the voodoo doll into the fireplace, causing the zombie to disappear. Todd is then visited by an apparition of Dana, who is in the hospital: she attempts to kill him, but Claire intercedes. The family attempts to flee the house but cannot find Jessica. Scrawled on a piece of paper, they find a list of observations Jessica has made about the dollhouse, one of which reads: "My hand disappears in the fireplace." Bill realizes the fireplace is a portal to somewhere else. Bill and Tobias enter the fireplace and realize they have entered the dollhouse. They find Jessica on the floor, surrounded by bloodied remnants of the voodoo dolls. Tobias casts a protective spell, allowing Bill and Jessica to flee: Tobias, however, is dragged away by the demons that have escaped from the dolls. Bill destroys the dollhouse by tossing it into the fireplace. As they flee in their car, the house explodes behind them.

Cast
 Robin Thomas as Bill Martin
 Starr Andreeff as Claire Martin (credited as Star Adreeff)
 Allen Cutler as Todd Martin
 Rachel Duncan as Jessica Martin
 Jarrett Lennon as Jimmy Martin
 Clayton Murray as Jimmy's Father
 Franc Ross as Tobias
 Lenore Kasdorf as Marla Martin
 Lisa Robin Kelly as Dana

Musical score

The film features an official score by composer Ray Colcord, which was released on compact disc in 1999.

Release
The film was released on VHS by Republic Pictures in 1996 and later on DVD by Lionsgate on September 28, 2004. In 2019, Vinegar Syndrome (under license from Multicom Entertainment Group) released the film on Blu-ray in the US which was included in the boxset ‘Amityville: The Cursed Collection’. In 2022, the film was released on Blu-ray in the UK courtesy of Screenbound Pictures Ltd.

Reception
The film was featured in the 2010 book 150 Movies You Should Die Before You See, in which reviewer Steve Miller wrote: "Don't bother asking why someone built a dollhouse replica of a place on Long Island. And don't ask how it ended up in a shack in the desert, or how it became filled with evil—the writer and director barely gave any thought to the subject. The film is rendered even less scary by the fact that no one seems particularly distressed by the weird developments." In 2015, TV Guide rated it two out of five stars, writing: "The awkwardly titled eighth film (!) in the Amityville series has its moments but adds little to the franchise or the horror genre in general."

See also
 Killer toys

References

External links
 
 

1996 direct-to-video films
1996 directorial debut films
1996 drama films
1996 films
1996 horror films
1996 independent films
1990s horror drama films
1990s psychological drama films
1990s psychological horror films
1990s supernatural horror films
American direct-to-video films
American haunted house films
American horror drama films
American independent films
American psychological drama films
American psychological horror films
American sequel films
American supernatural horror films
Amityville Horror films
Burn survivors in fiction
Demons in film
Direct-to-video drama films
Direct-to-video horror films
Direct-to-video sequel films
1990s English-language films
Films about dysfunctional families
Films about fires
Films about grieving
Films about haunted dolls
Films about murder
Films about nightmares
Films about precognition
Films about remarriage
Films about sentient toys
Films about widowhood
Films about witchcraft
Films set in 1996
Films set in California
Films set in hell
Films shot in Los Angeles County, California
Horror films about toys
Spontaneous human combustion in fiction
Teleportation in films
1990s American films